The Taifa of Ronda was a medieval Berber taifa kingdom centered in Moorish al-Andalus in what is now southern Spain. It existed from 1039 to 1065. The taifa was ruled by a family from the Berber Banu Ifran tribe of North Africa. Its capital was the city of Ronda. From 1065 until 1091, the taifa was under the control of the Taifa of Seville, led by Abbad II al-Mu'tadid.

List of Emirs

Yafranid dynasty
Abu Nour: 1039/40–1053/4
Badis ibn Hilal: 1053/4–1057/8
Abu Nur Hilal (restored): 1057/8
Abu Nars Fatuh: 1057/8–1065

See also
 List of Sunni Muslim dynasties

References

Ronda
Province of Málaga
History of Andalusia
11th century in Al-Andalus
States and territories established in 1039
1039 establishments in Europe
States and territories disestablished in 1065
1065 disestablishments in Europe
Berber dynasties